Bruno Jalander (28 August 1872 – 14 December 1966) was a Finnish military officer who served as minister of war in the post-World War I period between 1920 and 1923.

Early life
Jalander was born in Brahestad on 28 August 1872. He was educated at the Finnish Cadet Corps in Fredrikshamn.

Career and activities
Jalander served in Nyland's Finnish sniper battalion until the Finnish national military was disbanded. For three years he served with a Russian troop unit in the Caucasus. However, he left the army and worked in different jobs such as deputy chief of police and insurance inspector. When World War I broke out in 1914 Jalander resumed his military service in Russia where he served as company commander and battalion commander's adjutant in the defense units set up by the Petrograd Infantry Division. Following the Soviet revolution in 1917 Jalander began to work in the Office of the Governor-General of Finland. He was also a member of the military committee composed of the activists who gathered to fight against Russians. In November 1917 Jalander was promoted to the rank of lieutenant colonel and was appointed governor of Nyland county. In April 1918 after the German occupation of Helsinki he resumed his post as governor. In June 1918 he joined the Finnish army as a colonel.

On 15 March 1920 Jalander was appointed minister of war in Rafael Erich's cabinet. His rank was colonel at the time of his appointment, but a few months later he was promoted to the rank of major general. The cabinet resigned in April 1921.  In September 1921 Jalander was re-appointed minister of war to the second cabinet of Juho Vennola, replacing Onni Hämäläinen in the post. However, he resigned from the office soon after his appointment due to a conflict over the nomination of Carl Gustaf Emil Mannerheim as the head of the Civil Guard. Jalander was replaced by Lauri Malmberg as defense minister. Jalander continued to serve as minister of war in the cabinet led by Aimo Cajander and in the cabinet led by Kyösti Kallio between 14 November 1922 and 22 June 1923.

Personal life and death
Jalander married three times. His first spouse was Nina Helena Schultz with who he wed in 1906. His second wife was an opera singer, Aino Ackté, and they married in 1919. Jalander's third spouse was Zoja Orloff, and they wed in 1947.  Jalander died in Helsinki on 14 December 1966.

References

External links

1872 births
1966 deaths
Ministers of Defence of Finland
People from Raahe
Major generals